Tahirah Amandla Sharif is a British actress noted mainly for her roles as student Carrie Norton in Waterloo Road in 2015, Rebecca Jessel in the Netflix horror anthology series The Haunting of Bly Manor in 2020, and PC Lizzie Adama in The Tower in 2021 for which she received a Supporting Actress BAFTA nomination for.

Acting education
Tahirah Amandla Sharif is a British actress from Brixton, South West London, England born to a Pakistani mother and Jamaican father. Sharif's first taste of acting was in a school play at the age of six.
At 16 years of age, Sharif joined the Brit School for Performing Arts & Technology in Croydon, London. Later continuing her acting education attending evening classes at the Identity School of Acting in London.

Career
One of Sharif's first roles was in Film 4 short See Me as the lead.

In 2012, Sharif appeared in each episode of the BBC drama, One Night as Madison as well as appearing in the second series of ITV drama Whitechapel as Chantal Essian. In the same year Sharif played Esther Adams in the stage production of Moon on a Rainbow Shawl at The National Theatre and as Dunyazade in the stage production of Arabian Nights at the Tricycle Theatre. Sharif then appeared in her first feature film, The Invisible Woman as Rosa, starring alongside Ralph Fiennes and Felicity Jones.

In 2013, Sharif was cast as the teenage daughter of Martin Ashford (Patrick Robinson), Ella in the BBC television series Casualty. Ella was billed as "mischievous, a true troublemaker and determined to cause trouble for Ash [father, Martin]". Sharif's first scenes aired on 4 May 2013  and final scenes over a year later, on 17 May 2014.

After Casualty, Sharif reprised her role as Esther Adams in the stage production of Moon on a Rainbow Shawl for its UK national tour.
 
Sharif starred in the final ten episodes of long-running school drama, Waterloo Road, as student Carrie Norton in 2015. Her storylines included the return of her brother, Guy Braxton (Regé-Jean Page) and her relationship with Lenny Brown (Joe Slater). Sharif went onto play Kile in sci fi short film Pulsar in 2015 alongside Jessie Buckley and David Gyasi.
The same year, Sharif played Katie in Firebird at Hampstead Theatre. The play was so successful that it got transferred to west end theatre Trafalgar Studios in 2016.

In 2017, Sharif was cast as Melissa in A Christmas Prince, Netflix's hugely successful foray into holiday films. There were a further two films, as the first film proved incredibly popular. A Christmas Prince: The Royal Wedding and A Christmas Prince: The Royal Baby released on Netflix in 2018 and 2019 respectively.

Sharif also starred as Rebecca Jessel in the Netflix horror anthology series The Haunting of Bly Manor, which was released in October 2020.

Filmography

Film

Television

Theatre

References

External links
 

Living people
Actresses from London
Alumni of the Identity School of Acting
Black British actresses
English actresses of South Asian descent
English film actresses
English television actresses
English people of Jamaican descent
English people of Pakistani descent
People from the London Borough of Lambeth
Year of birth missing (living people)